A double referendum took place in Luxembourg on 28 September 1919. Voters were asked questions on their preferred head of state and whether there should be an economic union with either France or Belgium. The majority voted to retain Grand Duchess Charlotte as head of state, and for economic union with France.

Results

Head of state

Economic union

Outcome
Both results were seen as being highly indicative of the country's will, and were acted upon.  The result in favour of the monarchy was seen to be a Wilsonian act of self-determination, in opposition to the 'French' republic or the imposition of the Belgian dynasty.  By defeating both of these prospects, the referendum result put a clear end to the Allied Powers' discussion of Luxembourg's destiny. 
The political result was to have settled the national question, left the Grand Duchess as the incarnation of the nation itself, and settled the republican issue once and for all, as although the monarchy still had its detractors, particularly amongst socialists, its importance as a political issue waned considerably. An exception was the city of Esch-sur-Alzette, in which the majority (55%) voted for becoming a republic. In Luxembourg City only 33% voted for a republic.

The economic question was more difficult for the government to implement.  Indeed, since 1917, France had promised Belgium free rein (economically) in Luxembourg, and had informally precluded a customs union, but negotiations with the French government proceeded nonetheless, before collapsing in May 1920. This prompted the government to turn to Belgium, and within a year, negotiations had been settled, and a treaty signed on 25 July 1921 to create the Belgium-Luxembourg Economic Union (UEBL). Due to the referendum result, and a lingering distrust of Belgium's political motives, the public in Luxembourg greatly resented the treaty. However, the treaty was still successfully ratified by the Chamber of Deputies on 22 December 1922, with 27 votes for, 13 against, and 8 in abstention.

References

Referendums in Luxembourg
1919 referendums
Luxembourgish monarchy
Republicanism in Luxembourg
1919 in Luxembourg
1919 in international relations
Sovereignty referendums
Constitution of Luxembourg
History of Luxembourg (1890–1945)
Monarchy referendums
September 1919 events